Diablo Guardián is a Mexican streaming television drama based on the 2003 novel Diablo Guardián by Xavier Velasco and adapted by Televisa for Amazon Video. The series consists of two seasons, the first of 10 episodes and the second of 8 episodes. The first season premiered on 3 May 2018. It stars Paulina Gaitán as the titular character. The second season premiered on April 12, 2019.

Plot 
Diablo Guardian is a story in which colloquial language predominates, out of inhibitions and can even be considered vulgar, but that is only a hook to catch the reader; another is the way in which the author gradually captures the attention, as the protagonist's day-to-day goes by and also that, in the middle of the plot, the leading role is stolen and directed towards another character.

Violetta decides, in an accelerated moment of frustration, to steal two hundred and seventeen thousand dollars from her parents and cross the border to New York, with this she intends to seek a more accelerated life, full of waste and addictions; once achieving her goal of reaching the heart of New York, Violetta manages to live there for four years in which she learns to live by seduction. Capturing wealthy people in the lobbies of the most luxurious hotels, finding Nefástofeles in one of them, a rogue even more alive than her, who poses as a supposed heir who dazzles her and from that moment on, Violetta's life takes a turn. 180 degree turn.

Nefástofeles becomes a dagger stuck in the girl's back until she returns to Mexico, where she meets another unique character, "Pig". A writer, who by conformity ends up working as a simple publicist. After Pig's entry into Violetta's life, the Guardian Devil's time arrives. What becomes the crucial moment in history, since it is time to close your eyes, roll the dice and send everything to hell, but this is only done when you really believe that everything is going to end.

Cast 
 Paulina Gaitán as Violetta
 Adrián Ladrón as Pig
 Andrés Almeida as Nefastófeles
 Liz Gallardo as Noemí
 Leonardo Ortizgris as Henry
 Pedro Alonso as Gallego
 Armando Espitia as Lerdo
 Rodrigo Murray as Pedro

Episodes

Season 1 (2018)

Season 2 (2019)

References

External links 
 

2018 Mexican television series debuts
2010s Mexican television series
Spanish-language television shows
Mexican drama television series
Spanish-language Amazon Prime Video original programming
Televisa original programming
Television series about teenagers